The Belisario Domínguez Medal of Honor (Spanish: Medalla de Honor "Belisario Domínguez" del Senado de la República) is the highest award bestowed by the Mexican Senate.

It forms part of the Mexican Honors System and is currently Mexico's highest active award since there are no records of the Condecoración "Miguel Hidalgo" being presented since 1979. The award has been given every year since 1954 by the Senate of Mexico to eminent Mexicans with a distinguished lifetime career who contributed most "toward the welfare of the Nation and mankind".

Only Mexican entities representing "the cultural spirit of the time" are allowed to submit nominations for this award. This provision typically allows  universities, newspapers, learned societies, non-governmental organizations and government entities to nominate candidates.

Background

The award is named after politician Belisario Domínguez (1863–1913). Domínguez was a Senator for the state of Chiapas at the time of the Mexican Revolution. After Victoriano Huerta's coup d'état, which ousted President Francisco I. Madero, Domínguez circulated a speech as a letter to fellow members of congress in which he denounced Huerta's actions and encouraged Congress to depose him. At the end of his letter he also encouraged readers to make copies of it and distribute them around the country. The speech was not taken well in Huerta's circles and Domínguez was assassinated a few days later, on October 7, 1913.

In 1953, President Adolfo Ruiz Cortines signed the decree establishing the award in remembrance of this "martyr of democracy". That same year the Senate decided to bestow the first medal on the bust of Belisario Domínguez that already existed in the Senate Chamber as a symbolic act. It is for this reason that the medal was awarded twice in 1954.

Description
The medal consists of a single class and is awarded to a single recipient during a solemn ceremony in the Senate Chamber on October 7. A gold medal hanging from a silk ribbon with the colors of the Mexican flag is given together with a diploma signed by the President of the Republic and the leader of the Senate.

The medal has the national coat of arms on one side together with the inscription "Estados Unidos Mexicanos, H. Cámara de Senadores 1952-1958" ("United Mexican States, Honourable Chamber of Senators 1952-1958"). The reverse side of the medal has an image of Domínguez' bust together with the inscription "Ennobleció a la Patria, 7 de octubre de 1913" ("Ennobled the Nation, October 7, 1913").

Recipients
The following is a complete list of people who have been recipients of the Belisario Domínguez Medal. Only in 1954 and 2012 the medal has been awarded twice.

1954 – Rosaura Zapata and Erasmo Castellanos Quinto
1955 – Esteban Baca Calderón
1956 – Gerardo Murillo, "Dr. Atl"
1957 – Roque Estrada Reynoso
1958 – Antonio Díaz Soto y Gama
1959 – Heriberto Jara Corona
1960 – Isidro Fabela
1961 – José Inocente Lugo
1962 – María Tereza Montoya
1963 – María Hernández Zarco
1964 – Adrián Aguirre Benavides
1965 – Plácido Cruz Ríos
1966 – Ramón F. Iturbe
1967 – Francisco L. Urquizo
1968 – Miguel Angel Cevallos
1969 – María Cámara Vales, widow of Pino Suárez, Francisco I. Madero's vice president.
1970 – Rosendo Salazar
1971 – Jaime Torres Bodet
1972 – Ignacio Ramos Praslow
1973 – Pablo E. Macías Valenzuela
1974 – Rafael de la Colina Riquelme
1975 – Ignacio Chávez Sánchez
1976 – Jesús Romero Flores
1977 – Juan de Dios Bátiz Peredes
1978 – Gustavo Baz Prada
1979 – Fidel Velázquez Sánchez
1980 – Luis Padilla Nervo
1981 – Luis Alvarez Barret
1982 – Gen. Raúl Madero González
1983 – Jesús Silva Herzog
1984 – Salomón González Blanco
1985 – María Lavalle Urbina
1986 – Salvador Zubirán
1987 – Eduardo García Maynez
1988 – Rufino Tamayo
1989 – Raúl Castellano Jiménez
1990 – Andrés Serra Rojas
1991 – Gonzalo Aguirre Beltrán
1992 – Ramón G. Bonfil
1993 – Andrés Henestrosa Morales
1994 – Jaime Sabines Gutiérrez
1995 – Miguel León-Portilla
1996 – Griselda Álvarez Ponce de León and Alí Chumacero
1997 – Heberto Castillo Martínez
1998 – José Angel Conchello Dávila (post mortem)
1999 – Carlos Fuentes
2000 – Leopoldo Zea Aguilar
2001 – José Ezequiel Iturriaga Sauco
2002 – Héctor Fix Zamudio
2003 – Luis González y González
2004 – Carlos Canseco González
2005 – Gilberto Borja Navarrete
2006 – Jesús Kumate Rodríguez
2007 – Carlos Castillo Peraza (post mortem)
2008 – Miguel Ángel Granados Chapa
2009 – Antonio Ortiz Mena (post mortem)
2010 – Javier Barros Sierra (post mortem)
2010 – Luis H. Álvarez
2011 – Cuauhtémoc Cárdenas Solórzano
2012 – Ernesto de la Peña (post mortem)
2013 – Manuel Gómez Morín (post mortem)
2014 – Eraclio Zepeda
2015 – Alberto Bailleres
2016 – Gonzalo Rivas (post mortem)
2017 – Julia Carabias Lillo
2018 – Carlos Payán
2019 – Rosario Ibarra de Piedra
2020 – Personnel of the National Health System on the occasion of the COVID-19 pandemic
2021 – Manuel Velasco Suárez  (post mortem) and Ifigenia Martínez Hernández

See also
Condecoración Miguel Hidalgo
Mexican Honours System

References

Senado de la República (2005). Senado de la República - Medalla Belisario Domínguez. Retrieved November 20, 2005.
Senado de la República. Reglamento de la Medalla de Honor Belisario Domínguez. Diario Oficial de la Federación, December 12, 1953.
Senado de la República. Decreto por el cual se crea la Medalla de Honor “Belisario Domínguez” del Senado de la República, January 3, 1953
Jeffrey Kent Lucas.  The Rightward Drift of Mexico's Former Revolutionaries: The Case of Antonio Díaz Soto y Gama.  Lewiston, NY, USA: Edwin Mellen Press, 2010.

Orders, decorations, and medals of Mexico